"Do You Believe in Magic" is a song by American rock band the Lovin' Spoonful, written by John Sebastian in 1965. The single peaked at number 9 on the Billboard Hot 100 chart. In 1978, Shaun Cassidy reached the Top 40 with his cover version.

The Lovin' Spoonful version

In 1965, The Lovin' Spoonful originally recorded and released the song as the first single from their debut studio album Do You Believe in Magic. The single was well received by the public and became a top ten hit on the Billboard Hot 100, peaking at number 9. According to the lyrics, the magic referenced in the title is the power of music to supply happiness and freedom to both those who make it and those who listen to it. The Lovin' Spoonful's version was ranked number 216 on Rolling Stones list of The 500 Greatest Songs of All Time.  Billboard said of the original single release that the "pulsating folk-flavored rhythm number serves as a strong and exciting debut for new group in the Byrds vein."  Cash Box described it as a "rollicking, teen-angled romancer with an infectious danceable riff."

In a 2007 DVD entitled The Lovin' Spoonful with John Sebastian - Do You Believe in Magic, author Sebastian illustrates how he sped up the three-chord intro from Martha and the Vandellas' "Heat Wave" to come up with the intro to "Do You Believe in Magic."

"Do You Believe in Magic" was featured in The Parent Trap, American Pie, Date Movie, Temple Grandin, and The Super Mario Bros. Super Show!. The original version was also the theme song for the short-lived TV series State of Grace. The song is also significantly featured in the Jim Sheridan movie In America, as an Irish-immigrant family, having entered the U.S. on false pretenses, enter New York City for the first time.

In 2012, the Lovin' Spoonful's version was used in the official "Meet the Pyro" trailer for the first-person shooter video game Team Fortress 2. As a worried RED Spy remarks, "One shudders to imagine what inhuman thoughts lie behind that mask...What dream of chronic and sustained cruelty?" the camera zooms in on Pyro's eye, revealing that he actually thinks he is in a Candy Land-like utopia world, while bits and pieces of the song playing in the background as it shifts between his mind and what is actually happening.

Charts

Weekly charts

Year-end charts

Shaun Cassidy version

"Do You Believe in Magic" became a top forty hit again in 1978 in both the U.S. and Canada when Shaun Cassidy released his cover as a single. Cassidy's version reached number 31 on the Billboard Hot 100.  The song was Cassidy's second successful remake of a 1960s hit, the first being "Da Doo Ron Ron" from his previous LP.

Chart performance

Weekly charts

Year-end charts

Aly & AJ version

"Do You Believe in Magic" was covered by American pop rock duo Aly & AJ. Their version of the song was for Aly's film Now You See It..., and it also appeared in the 2007 Disney film "The Game Plan" as well as on their debut studio album, Into the Rush, in addition to an appearance on the 2009 soundtrack to the TV show Wizards of Waverly Place. The video has Aly and AJ performing with acoustic guitars in their loft apartment, cuddling their dog, taking Polaroids and then finger painting.

Track listings

Release history

Chart performance

References

The Lovin' Spoonful songs
1965 debut singles
1978 singles
Shaun Cassidy songs
2005 debut singles
Aly & AJ songs
Songs written by John Sebastian
Grammy Hall of Fame Award recipients
1965 songs
Song recordings produced by Erik Jacobsen
Song recordings produced by Michael Lloyd
Kama Sutra Records singles
Warner Records singles
Hollywood Records singles